Dmitri Pavlov may refer to:

 Dmitry Pavlov (general) (1897–1941), Soviet general
 Dmitri Pavlov (composer) (born 1959), Russian composer